Cable Bay is a settlement on the southern side of Doubtless Bay in Northland, New Zealand.  runs through it. It is one of the Taipa-Mangonui string of settlements, separated from Taipa on the west by the Taipa River and from Coopers Beach on the east by Otanenui Stream.

The name comes from the Pacific Cable Station which was a terminus of a telegraph cable running between New Zealand and British Columbia as part of the All Red Line. The station was established in 1902 and operated until the terminus was moved to Auckland in 1912.

Demographics
Statistics New Zealand describes Cable Bay as a rural settlement. Cable Bay is part of the larger Taumarumaru statistical area.

Cable Bay had a population of 891 at the 2018 New Zealand census, an increase of 198 people (28.6%) since the 2013 census, and an increase of 279 people (45.6%) since the 2006 census. There were 351 households, comprising 414 males and 477 females, giving a sex ratio of 0.87 males per female, with 132 people (14.8%) aged under 15 years, 105 (11.8%) aged 15 to 29, 381 (42.8%) aged 30 to 64, and 273 (30.6%) aged 65 or older.

Ethnicities were 80.5% European/Pākehā, 27.6% Māori, 3.4% Pacific peoples, 3.0% Asian, and 2.4% other ethnicities. People may identify with more than one ethnicity.

Of those people who chose to answer the census's question about religious affiliation, 49.2% had no religion, 36.7% were Christian, 2.0% had Māori religious beliefs, 0.7% were Hindu, 0.7% were Buddhist and 2.4% had other religions.

Of those at least 15 years old, 138 (18.2%) people had a bachelor or higher degree, and 162 (21.3%) people had no formal qualifications. 84 people (11.1%) earned over $70,000 compared to 17.2% nationally. The employment status of those at least 15 was that 255 (33.6%) people were employed full-time, 114 (15.0%) were part-time, and 33 (4.3%) were unemployed.

Notes

Far North District
Populated places in the Northland Region